Charlie Williams (born January 5, 1977, in Seoul, South Korea) is an American professional pool player. Williams represented America as a player at the Mosconi Cup 5 times (2001, 2002, 2003, 2004 and 2005) and as a non-playing captain in 2011. In 2001, Williams founded the sports marketing company Dragon Promotions.

At the 2008 WPA World Ten-ball Championships, Williams would reach the quarter-finals, defeating Chang Jung-Lin (9-8), and Fu Che-wei (9-5), before losing to Darren Appleton 11–5.

In 2011, Williams reached the semi-finals of the Dragon 14.1 Tournament but lost to Mike Davis.

Career titles
 2010 Derby City Classic 14.1 Challenge
 2008 Lucasi 10-Ball
 2008 Quezon City Invasion
 2007 Korea Pro Tour Championship 
 2006 JBC Japan Championship
 2006 Seminole Florida Pro Tour 
 2005 Mosconi Cup 
 2005 Korea International Championship
 2004 Florida State 9-Ball Championship 
 2004 Mosconi Cup 
 2003 Firecracker Open 
 2003 UPA Big Apple 9-Ball Challenge
 2003 UPA Capitol City Classic
 2003 Mosconi Cup 
 2002 BCA Open 9-Ball Championship
 2001 Mosconi Cup 
 2001 Turning Stone Classic

References

External links

American pool players
Living people
Sportspeople from Seoul
1977 births
Competitors at the 2005 World Games